Arthur Bulkeley (died 1553) was Bishop of Bangor from 1541 until his death in 1553.

Bulkeley was born in Beaumaris, Anglesey. He was a graduate of Oxford University and in 1523 became Rector of St Peter-le-Bailey, Oxford. Later he was the incumbent at St James Garlickhythe in the City of London.  In 1541 he was appointed Bishop of Bangor and consecrated 19 February 1542. He died on 14 March 1553.

Notes

Year of birth unknown
1553 deaths
Bishops of Bangor
People from Beaumaris
Alumni of the University of Oxford
16th-century Welsh Anglican bishops